Alux Nahual is a Guatemalan rock band formed in 1979 by brothers Plubio and Álvaro Aguilar, and their cousin Ranferi Aguilar. This band was born in the context of the confrontation between the guerrillas and the army. Alux Nahual (Espíritu del Duende in Spanish or Spirit of the Goblin in English) is a maya-quiche phrase naming a goblin similar to a leprechaun or elf. The band's climax came in 1995 while performing in a sold-out show at Los Angeles Palace.

Other members before 1990 included Pablo Mayorga, Orlando Aguilar and Javier Flores, all drummers.
In the year 2006 they had a reunion tour, to raise funds to help the victims of Hurricane Stan, that affected certain regions of Guatemala in year 2005. The band still remains active and has played unplugged concerts in 2007 as well as 2 other shows in the Trovajazz venue in Guatemala the 14th and 15 December 2007. They were billed by the band as the last shows for 2007 perhaps as an indicator of more activity in 2008.

The band could very well be the best rock band Guatemala has produced. Their style is characterized by the incorporation of classic instruments like the cello and the flute to rock tunes, ballads and folk songs.

Band members are well versed musicians and often switch instruments in live performances from piano to guitar and so on.

They also blend into their music elements of progressive rock. Case in point: the bridge of their classic song "Como un Duende" where they switch time signature and melody.

In their early days, they often rehearsed at the home of their grandmother, Guatemalan poet Magdalena Spínola.

Band members
 Álvaro Aguilar – vocals, guitar
 Rodolfo Lenin Fernández Paz – drums, percussion 
 Óscar Conde – flute, keyboard, saxophone 
 Paulo Alvarado – cello
 Plubio Eugenio – bass guitar 
 Ranferí Aguilar Schinini – guitar
 Jack Schuster – violin, mandolin

Discography
Alux Nahual (1981)
Conquista (1982)
Hermanos de Sentimiento (1984)
Centroamérica (1986)
Alto Al fuego (1987)
La Trampa (1989)
Americamorfósis (1993)
Se Cantan Retratos (1997)
Murciélago Danzante (2012)

Compilations and Anthologies
Leyenda I (1992)
Leyenda II (1996)
Antología I (2001)
Antología II (2002)
La Historia del Duende (2002)

Tribute albums
Espíritu Del Duende I (1998)
Espíritu Del Duende II (1999)

References

External links
 http://www.aluxnahual.com
 http://music.yahoo.com/ar-313935-bio--Alux-Nahual
 Alux Nahual's Lyrics

Alux Nahual
Musical groups established in 1979